Dawn of the Dickies is the second studio album by the California punk band Dickies. It includes the UK hits "Nights in White Satin" (a high-speed cover of the Moody Blues song), which reached No. 39 in the UK chart in September 1979, and "Fan Mail," which made No. 57 in February 1980.

The album's title and jacket cover, depicting the band members set upon by "zombies" in blue make-up, was a salute to the George A. Romero horror film, Dawn of the Dead.

Critical reception
Trouser Press wrote: "By slowing down the tempo a half step and coming up with strong melodies, guitarist Stan Lee and crew manage to reel off one maniacally catchy gem after another."

Track listing

Personnel 

 Leonard Graves Phillips - Lead vocals, Mellotron, Piano, Organ
 Stan Lee - Guitars, Vocals
 Chuck Wagon - Keyboards, Guitars, Saxophone, Harmonica, Vocals
 Billy Club - Bass, Vocals
 Karlos Kaballero - Drums, Percussion, No vocals

Produced and Engineered by Robin Geoffrey Cable

References

The Dickies albums
1979 albums
A&M Records albums